Grainville-Ymauville is a commune in the Seine-Maritime department in the Normandy region in northern France.

Geography
The SNCF railways have a station here.

Heraldry

Population

Places of interest
 The church of St-Vigor-et-Notre-Dame, dating from the eighteenth century.
 The eighteenth century chateau de Grainville.

Notable people
 Nicole Fontaine, former president of the European Parliament was born here.

See also
Communes of the Seine-Maritime department

References

Communes of Seine-Maritime